Newsholme railway station was a railway station that served the small village of Newsholme in Lancashire. It was built by the Lancashire and Yorkshire Railway. It was closed in 1957.

Services

References 

Lancashire Steam Finale by Michael S. Welch

Disused railway stations in Ribble Valley
Former Lancashire and Yorkshire Railway stations
Railway stations in Great Britain opened in 1880
Railway stations in Great Britain closed in 1957